Tina Fernandes Botts is a legal scholar and philosophy professor currently teaching at the San Joaquin College of Law.  She is known for her work in legal hermeneutics, intersectionality, feminist philosophy, and philosophy of race (particularly mixed-race theory).  Previous posts include Visiting Scholar at Dartmouth College; Visiting Professor of Law at University of the Pacific, McGeorge School of Law; Assistant Professor of Philosophy at California State University, Fresno; Visiting Assistant Professor of philosophy at Oberlin College; Fellow in Law and Philosophy at the University of Michigan, Ann Arbor; and Assistant Professor of Philosophy, and Faculty Associate and Area Leader in Public Policy and Diversity, at the University of North Carolina at Charlotte. She is the former chair of the American Philosophical Association's Committee on the Status of Black Philosophers (2013-2016).

Education and career
Botts earned her Ph.D. in philosophy from the University of Memphis under the supervision of Thomas Nenon, her J.D. from Rutgers School of Law, and her B.A. in philosophy with a minor in physics from the University of Maryland at College Park. Her scholarship is inter-traditional (analytic, continental)  interdisciplinary (philosophy, law), and grounded in the history of philosophy. During her brief time at Oberlin, she was one of several professors that the ABUSUA group demanded placement on the tenure track at Oberlin as part of their list of demands (https://silo.tips/download/oberlin-colleges-abusua-black-student-union-institutional-d).

Research areas

Botts' research areas are constitutional law, philosophy of law (including critical race theory), philosophical hermeneutics, philosophy of race, feminist philosophy, ethical theory, and applied ethics.  Her scholarship centers on the reexamination of laws and other paradigms (ethical, social, political, metaphysical, and epistemological) from the vantage point of the marginalized and oppressed, particularly racialized minority groups. Where a given paradigm is found lacking, Botts advocates alternative approaches or paradigm shifts designed to more fully respect these populations. The suggested paradigm shifts are grounded in insights obtained from philosophical hermeneutics, critical legal theory, and general themes in metaphysics and epistemology as found in the history of philosophy.  Key to Botts' research is the hermeneutical insight that there is an intimate connection between what we take things to be (e.g., a race) and what we take things to mean (e.g., a law), and that both are heavily influenced by context, history, social forces, and the identity of the knower and/or the perceiver of reality.

Awards, fellowships and courtesy appointments

 2021-22: Visiting Scholar, Department of Philosophy, Dartmouth College, Hanover, NH
 2015–16: Consortium for Faculty Diversity in Liberal Arts Colleges Postdoctoral Fellow, Oberlin College, Oberlin, OH
 2014–15: Fellow in Law and Philosophy, University of Michigan, Ann Arbor, MI
 2009–10: Dissertation Teaching Fellow in Law and Philosophy, Arkansas State University
 2009–10: Provost's Doctoral Fellow, University of Memphis, Memphis, TN
 1992–93: Legal Fellow, Reporters Committee for Freedom of the Press, Washington, DC
 1991–92: C. Clyde Ferguson Full Tuition Scholarship, Rutgers School of Law, Camden, NJ

Selected works
For Equals Only:  Race, Equality, and the Equal Protection Clause, Rowman & Littlefield, 2018. 
"Legal Hermeneutics," Internet Encyclopedia of Philosophy, 2015. 
 Philosophy and the Mixed Race Experience, Lexington Books/Rowman & Littlefield, 2016. 
 "Antidiscrimination Law and the Multiracial Experience:  A Reply to Nancy Leong"  10 Hastings Race and Poverty Law Journal  191, Summer 2013.
 "Hermeneutics, Race, and Gender" in The Routledge Companion to Philosophical Hermeneutics, Jeff Malpas and Hans-Helmuth Gander, eds., London: Taylor and Francis (2014).
 Feminist Thought. 5th Edition, co-authored with Rosemarie Tong, Boulder, CO: Westview Press, 2013.

References

External links
 tinafernandesbotts.com
 Autobiographical interview with Botts

University of Michigan faculty
Living people
Date of birth missing (living people)
American philosophers
American philosophy academics
University of Memphis alumni
University of Memphis faculty
Rutgers School of Law–Camden alumni
University of Maryland, College Park alumni
Arkansas State University faculty
Feminist philosophers
Year of birth missing (living people)